Browns Lake is a small alpine lake in Elmore County, Idaho, United States, located in the Sawtooth Mountains in the Sawtooth National Recreation Area.  Sawtooth National Forest trail 480 travels along the Little Queens River from the intersection of trails 454 and 459 directly to Browns Lake.

Browns Lake is in the Sawtooth Wilderness, and a wilderness permit can be obtained at a registration box at trailheads or wilderness boundaries.

References

See also
 List of lakes of the Sawtooth Mountains (Idaho)
 Sawtooth National Forest
 Sawtooth National Recreation Area
 Sawtooth Range (Idaho)

Lakes of Idaho
Lakes of Elmore County, Idaho
Glacial lakes of the United States
Glacial lakes of the Sawtooth Wilderness